Fershampenuaz (from ) is a rural locality (a selo) and the administrative center of Nagaybaksky District of Chelyabinsk Oblast, Russia, located on the left bank of the Gumbeyka River (a tributary of the Ufa). Population:  Postal code: 457650.

History
It was founded in 1842 by Nağaybäks from Belebeyevsky Uyezd, the Cossacks of the Orenburg Host. Like several other Ural villages, among them Parizh (Paris) and Berlin, it was named to honor the feats of Cossacks in the war against Napoleon—in this case, the victorious Battle of Fère-Champenoise that took place on March 25, 1814.

Notable persons
Leonid Smetannikov (b 1943), Soviet opera singer bearing the title of People's Artist of the USSR

References

External links
Encyclopedia of the Urals history.  Entry on Fershampenuaz 
МОУ Фершампенуазская СОШ,  website of the secondary school #0-1 in Fershampenuaz 

Images
Sports complex "Olymp" in Fershampenuaz 
A panoramic winter view of the village 

Rural localities in Chelyabinsk Oblast